The 2011–12 NBL season is the 29th season for the Melbourne Tigers in the NBL. After missing out on the playoffs last season, Melbourne will look to improve and return to finals stages of this season's competition. Due to the 2011 NBA Lockout, Melbourne acquired the services of Patrick Mills for the first 9 rounds until losing him to the Chinese team Xinjiang Flying Tigers.

Off-season

Additions

Roster

Depth chart

Regular season

Standings

Game log

|- style="background-color:#cfc;"
| 1
| 7 October
| Sydney
| W 82–76
| Patrick Mills (28)
| Cameron Tragardh (9)
| Ayinde Ubaka (2)
| State Netball Hockey Centre
| 1–0
|- style="background-color:#fcc;"
| 2
| 14 October
| @ Perth
| L 92–76
| Patrick Mills (19)
| Tommy Greer (9)
| Ayinde Ubaka (6)
| Challenge Stadium 
| 1–1
|- style="background-color:#cfc;"
| 3
| 22 October 
| New Zealand
| W 67–64
| Patrick Mills (19)
| Daniel Dillon (7)
| Daniel Dillon (4)
| State Netball Hockey Centre 
| 2–1
|- style="background-color:#cfc;"
| 4
| 30 October
| @ Wollongong
| W 74–82
| Patrick Mills (20)
| Burston, Walker (6)
| Liam Rush (4)
| WIN Entertainment Centre
| 3–1

|- style="background-color:#cfc;"
| 5
| 4 November
| @ Sydney
| W 76–94
| Patrick Mills (20)
| Dillon, Walker (5)
| Patrick Mills (8)
| Sydney Entertainment Centre
| 4–1
|- style="background-color:#cfc;"
| 6
| 6 November
| Cairns
| W 80–63
| Cameron Tragardh (17)
| Tommy Greer (9)
| Patrick Mills (10)
| State Netball Hockey Centre 
| 5–1
|- style="background-color:#fcc;"
| 7
| 11 November
| Townsville
| L 88–95
| Cameron Tragardh (26)
| Cameron Tragardh (14)
| Patrick Mills (10)
| State Netball Hockey Centre 
| 5–2
|- style="background-color:#cfc;"
| 8
| 18 November
| Perth
| W 87–82
| Ayinde Ubaka (23)
| Tommy Greer (7)
| Patrick Mills (6)
| State Netball Hockey Centre 
| 6–2
|- style="background-color:#fcc;"
| 9
| 19 November
| @ Adelaide
| L 95–89
| Patrick Mills (32)
| Ron Dorsey (7)
| Mills, Ubaka, Walker (3)
| Adelaide Arena
| 6–3 
|- style="background-color:#fcc;"
| 10
| 25 November
| Sydney
| L 80–89
| Cameron Tragardh (28)
| Cameron Tragardh (5)
| Dillon, Greer (4)
| State Netball Hockey Centre
| 6–4

|- style="background-color:#fcc;"
| 11
| 2 December
| @ New Zealand
| L 108–98
| Ron Dorsey (21)
| Tommy Greer (14)
| Daniel Dillon (6)
| North Shore Events Centre
| 6–5
|- style="background-color:#fcc;"
| 12
| 10 December
| @ Cairns
| L 79–77
| Cameron Tragardh (24)
| Ron Dorsey (12)
| Ayinde Ubaka (5)
| Cairns Convention Centre
| 6–6
|- style="background-color:#cfc;"
| 13
| 18 December
| Townsville
| W 93–80
| Cameron Tragardh (19)
| Tommy Greer (8)
| Daniel Dillon (4)
| State Netball Hockey Centre
| 7–6
|- style="background-color:#cfc;"
| 14
| 23 December
| Cairns
| W 67–65
| Cameron Tragardh (14)
| Rush, Tragardh (5)
| Daniel Dillon (5)
| State Netball Hockey Centre
| 8–6
|- style="background-color:#cfc;"
| 15
| 31 December
| @ Gold Coast
| W 72–79
| Cameron Tragardh (25)
| Dillon, Greer (7)
| Daniel Dillon (4)
| Gold Coast Convention Centre
| 9–6

|- style="background-color:#fcc;"
| 16
| 6 January 
| @  Perth
| L 72–67
| Rush, Tragardh (17)
| Cameron Tragardh (9)
| Daniel Dillon (6)
| Challenge Stadium
| 9–7
|- style="background-color:#fcc;"
| 17
| 8 January
| New Zealand
| L 79–90 
| Cameron Tragardh (22)
| Cameron Tragardh (7) 
| Dillon, Ubaka (5)
| State Netball Hockey Centre
| 9–8
|- style="background-color:#fcc;"
| 18
| 15 January
| Gold Coast
| L 60–73
| Cameron Tragardh (14)
| Cameron Tragardh (6)
| Daniel Dillon (5)
| State Netball Hockey Centre
| 9–9
|- style="background-color:#fcc;"
| 19
| 19 January
| @ New Zealand
| L 91–77
| Dillon, Rush (18)
| Tommy Greer (7)
| Dillon, Tragardh (4)
| North Shore Events Centre
| 9–10
|- style="background-color:#fcc;"
| 20
| 21 January
| @ Gold Coast
| L 92–78
| Ron Dorsey (24)
| Cameron Tragardh (6)
| Myron Allen (8)
| Gold Coast Convention Centre
| 9–11
|- style="background-color:#fcc;"
| 21
| 27 January
| @ Wollongong
| L 90–68
| Liam Rush (18)
| Myron Allen (9)
| Myron Allen (6)
| WIN Entertainment Centre
| 9–12

|- style="background-color:#fcc;"
| 22
| 3 February
| Adelaide
| W 87–81
| Cameron Tragardh (20)
| Allen, Greer, Walker (6)
| Myron Allen (8)
| State Netball Hockey Centre
| 10–12
|- style="background-color:#cfc;"
| 23
| 18 February
| @ Cairns
| L 77–56
| Myron Allen (13)
| Myron Allen (10)
| Myron Allen (3)
| Cairns Convention Centre
| 10–13
|- style="background-color:#fcc;"
| 24
| 25 February
| Adelaide
| L 83–92
| Cameron Tragardh (19)
| Lucas Walker (9)
| Myron Allen (7)
| State Netball Hockey Centre
| 10–14

|- style="background-color:#cfc;"
| 25
| 2 March
| @ Sydney
| W 61–66
| Lucas Walker (12)
| Lucas Walker (7)
| Myron Allen (4)
| Sydney Entertainment Centre
| 11–14
|- style="background-color:#fcc;"
| 26
| 4 March
| @ Townsville
| L 67–64
| Dorsey, Walker (13)
| Burston, Walker (6)
| Myron Allen (7)
| Townsville Entertainment Centre
| 11–15
|- style="background-color:#fcc;"
| 27
| 18 March
| Wollongong
| L 61–71
| Bennie Lewis (15)
| Tommy Greer (8)
| Dillon (7)
| State Netball Hockey Centre
| 11–16
|- style="background-color:#fcc;"
| 28
| 23 March
| Perth
| L 71–72
| Ron Dorsey (22)
| Matt Burston (13)
| Myron Allen (7)
| State Netball Hockey Centre
| 11–17

See also
2011–12 NBL season

References

External links
Official Site of the Tigers

Melbourne United seasons
Melbourne
Melbourne United